Just JJ World Tour 2006 is the first live album by Singaporean singer JJ Lin, released on 29 December 2006 by Ocean Butterflies.

Track listing
 演唱会前传：忘记
 木乃伊
 开场白
 翅膀
 善与恶
 明天
 就是我
 被风吹过的夏天
 爱笑的眼睛
 I Do
 记得
 听不懂没关系
 熟能生巧
 决战时刻
 第二天堂
 子弹列车
 进化论
 一千年以后
 Encore
 只对你说
 英雄再现
 江南
 幕后英雄策

References 

2006 albums
JJ Lin video albums